Gay USA is an American documentary film released in 1978 and directed by Arthur J. Bressan, Jr. The documentary focuses on the gay rights movement. Composed of footage shot at a number of gay pride events around the United States in 1977, the film captures a time just as the gay rights movement began facing the first organized backlash in the form of Anita Bryant and her campaign to repeal anti-discrimination protection in Dade County.

Notes

External links
 Gay USA at the Internet Movie Database
 Review
 

1978 films
Documentary films about LGBT topics
American LGBT-related films
Films directed by Arthur J. Bressan Jr.
1978 documentary films
1978 LGBT-related films
1978 in LGBT history
1970s English-language films
1970s American films